Marco Barbini (born 16 October 1990) is a retired Italian rugby union player. His usual position was in the back-row.

From 2014 to 2021, Barbini played with Italian Pro14 team Benetton.

From 2009 to 2012 Barbini was named in the Italy Under 20 squad and in 2012 he was named in the Emerging Italy squad for the 2012 IRB Nations Cup.
In January 2015, Barbini was called into the Italian squad for the 2015 Six Nations Championship. He represented Italy on 3 occasions, from 2015 to 2019.

References

External links
ESPN Profile
It's Rugby France Profile

1990 births
Living people
Sportspeople from Padua
Italian rugby union players
Italy international rugby union players
Rugby union number eights
Rugby union flankers
Petrarca Rugby players
Mogliano Rugby players
Benetton Rugby players